Lithuania, at the 2002 European Athletics Championships held in Germany. In this European Championship started 13 athletes who represented Lithuania.

Results

Nations at the 2002 European Athletics Championships
2002
European Athletics Championships